Bata Furai (born 4 January 1985) is a Solomon Islander footballer who plays as a defender for Solomon Warriors F.C. in the Solomon Islands S-League.

References

1985 births
Living people
Solomon Islands footballers
Association football defenders
Solomon Islands international footballers
Solomon Warriors F.C. players